Bhram (English: The Illusion) is a 2008 Hindi suspense thriller film starring Dino Morea, Milind Soman and Sheetal Menon. It was produced by Nari Hira and directed by Pavan Kaul. Music of the film was composed by Pritam.

Plot
Bhram - An Illusion is the story of Antara Tyagi and Shantanu Rawal and their love marred by the reality of life. Antara is a successful supermodel- who has it all but is hiding behind the veil of a traumatic past. Shantanu is the most eligible bachelor in town and his love for Antara will put his love, faith, family and friendships on trial. The story seems like horror with suspense too.

Cast
 Dino Morea as Shantanu Rawal
 Milind Soman as Devendra 'Inder' Rawal
 Sheetal Menon as Antara Y. Tyagi 
 Simone Singh as Vinita Devendra Rawal 
 Chetan Hansraj as Prem Mathur
 Deepshikha Nagpal as Sunita Sharma
 Ananya Shukla as Little Antara
 Karan Singh Grover as Carlson
 Vishal Watwani as Vishal Sharma
 Deepak Jethi as Kuldeep Rathore

Soundtrack
The soundtrack was composed by Pritam. Lyrics were penned by Irshad Kamil and Kumaar.

Track listings

References

External links 
 

2008 films
Indian drama films
2000s Hindi-language films
Films featuring songs by Pritam
2008 drama films
Hindi-language drama films